Fabiano Ribeiro de Freitas (born 29 February 1988), known simply as Fabiano, is a Brazilian professional footballer who plays as a goalkeeper for Cypriot club Omonia.

Club career

São Paulo and Olhanense
Born in Mundo Novo, Bahia, Fabiano joined São Paulo in 2006, aged 18. During his four-year spell he only played two Série A games, also being loaned to several modest teams. He made his debut in the top division on 13 October 2007 in a 1–1 draw against Fluminense at the Maracanã Stadium where he saved a penalty, being part of the squads that won back-to-back national championships.

On 28 June 2011, Fabiano signed with Portuguese club Olhanense. He made his debut in the Primeira Liga on 13 August in a 1–1 draw at Sporting CP, and went on to appear in all league matches during the season as the Algarve side retained their division status.

Porto
Fabiano moved to Porto in late May 2012, penning a four-year contract. He acted as understudy to compatriot Helton in his debut campaign, subsequently becoming a starter after an injury to the latter.

On 21 April 2015, in an away fixture for the quarter-finals of the UEFA Champions League against Bayern Munich, Fabiano's team lost 6–1, making it the worst in their European history. In the subsequent off-season, he was loaned to Fenerbahçe.

Back at the Estádio do Dragão, Fabiano missed the vast majority of 2017–18 due to an injury to his right knee. He earned a champions' winners medal in the last matchday after playing the last minutes of the 1–0 away win over Vitória de Guimarães, having replaced third choice Vaná.

Fabiano played all the matches save one in the 2018–19 edition of the Taça de Portugal, where his team reached the final. He was not featured in the domestic league, however.

Omonia
Fabiano signed a one-year deal with Omonia of the Cypriot First Division on 17 October 2019, as a free agent. He made his debut three days later, in a 0–0 away draw with Anorthosis Famagusta. In January 2020, he sustained an injury which kept him out of action until the abandonment of the season due to the COVID-19 pandemic; on 9 June, he agreed to an extension until 2022.

On 16 September 2020, Fabiano was in goal for a Champions League qualifier against Red Star Belgrade, saving two attempts in the penalty shootout to help his team reach the group stage of a European competition for the first time in their history. He was crowned champion on the domestic front, a first for the club since 2010; as a result, he was voted Footballer of the Year and also renewed his contract until June 2024.

In the 2021–22 campaign, Fabiano was involved in four shootouts, helping Omonia beat Anorthosis in the Cypriot Super Cup, Flora Tallinn in the third qualifying round of the UEFA Europa League and Ethnikos Achna in the final of the Cypriot Cup; he prevented the opposition from scoring a total of six times.

Honours
São Paulo
Campeonato Brasileiro Série A: 2007

Porto
Primeira Liga: 2012–13, 2017–18
Supertaça Cândido de Oliveira: 2012, 2013

Omonia
Cypriot First Division: 2020–21
Cypriot Cup: 2021–22
Cypriot Super Cup: 2021

Individual
Cypriot First Division Player of the Year: 2020–21

References

External links
 

1988 births
Living people
Brazilian footballers
Association football goalkeepers
Campeonato Brasileiro Série A players
Rio Branco Esporte Clube players
São Paulo FC players
Esporte Clube Santo André players
América Futebol Clube (RN) players
Primeira Liga players
Liga Portugal 2 players
S.C. Olhanense players
FC Porto B players
FC Porto players
Süper Lig players
Fenerbahçe S.K. footballers
Cypriot First Division players
AC Omonia players
Brazilian expatriate footballers
Expatriate footballers in Portugal
Expatriate footballers in Turkey
Expatriate footballers in Cyprus
Brazilian expatriate sportspeople in Portugal
Brazilian expatriate sportspeople in Turkey
Brazilian expatriate sportspeople in Cyprus